Methionine-R-sulfoxide reductase B1 is an enzyme that in humans is encoded by the SEPX1 gene.

This gene encodes a selenoprotein, which contains a selenocysteine (Sec) residue at its active site. The selenocysteine is encoded by the UGA codon that normally signals translation termination. The 3' UTR of selenoprotein genes have a common stem-loop structure, the sec insertion sequence (SECIS), that is necessary for the recognition of UGA as a Sec codon rather than as a stop signal. This protein belongs to the methionine sulfoxide reductase B (MsrB) family, and it is expressed in a variety of adult and fetal tissues.

See also
MSRA (gene)
MSRB2
Methionine oxidation

References

Further reading

Selenoproteins